Sylvanus Okello (born 14 April 1963) is a Kenyan boxer. He competed in the men's light heavyweight event at the 1984 Summer Olympics.

References

1963 births
Living people
Kenyan male boxers
Olympic boxers of Kenya
Boxers at the 1984 Summer Olympics
Place of birth missing (living people)
Light-heavyweight boxers